Les Alleux is a former commune in the Ardennes department in northern France. On 1 January 2016, it was merged into the new commune Bairon et ses environs.

The inhabitants of the commune are known as Alleusiens or Alleusiennes, or alternatively Alleutiers or Alleutières.

Geography
The commune can be accessed by the D977 road from Vouziers in the south passing through the commune to the east of the village and continuing to Le Chesne in the north. Access to the village is by the D23 road from Voncq in the west and continuing north to join the D977 inside the commune. Most of the east and west of the commune are forested with the central part farmland.

An unnamed stream rises south of the village and flows north-west to join the Ruisseau des Graquinettes just west of the commune.

Neighbouring communes and villages

Heraldry

Administration

List of Successive Mayors

Demography
In 2012 the commune had 81 inhabitants.

French Decorations
Croix de Guerre 1914-1918: 9 March 1921

Sites and Monuments

Notable people linked to the commune
Tristan de Villelongue (1562-1631) was a doctor of theology, councillor of state and a preacher for Henry IV

See also
Communes of the Ardennes department

External links
Les Alleux on the old National Geographic Institute website 
Les Alleux on the 1750 Cassini Map

References

Former communes of Ardennes (department)
Populated places disestablished in 2016